This is a list of by-elections in Canada since Confederation. The list includes Ministerial by-elections which occurred due to the requirement that Members of Parliament recontest their seats upon being appointed to Cabinet. These by-elections were almost always uncontested. This requirement was abolished in 1931.

Notable by-election upsets in Canadian history include the 1949 by-election in Kamouraska where the Liberals, who had won the riding by a 55.8 percentage point margin in the previous general election, were defeated by the Independent Liberal candidate in the by-election; the 1943 Cartier by-election which the Liberals lost to the Labor-Progressive Party's Fred Rose; Deborah Grey's 1989 by-election victory in Beaver River in which she won the Reform Party of Canada's first seat, and Gilles Duceppe's 1990 upset by-election victory in Laurier—Sainte-Marie on behalf of the newly formed Bloc Québécois.

44th Parliament (2021–present)

43rd Parliament (2019–2021)

42nd Parliament (2015–2019)

41st Parliament (2011–2015)

40th Parliament (2008–2011)

39th Parliament (2006–2008)

38th Parliament (2004–2006)

37th Parliament (2000–2004)

36th Parliament (1997–2000)

35th Parliament (1994–1997)

34th Parliament (1988–1993)

33rd Parliament (1984–1988)

32nd Parliament (1980–1984)

31st Parliament (1979)

30th Parliament (1974–1979)

29th Parliament (1973–1974) 
no by-elections

28th Parliament (1968–1972)

27th Parliament (1965–1968)

26th Parliament (1963–1965)

25th Parliament (1962–1963)

24th Parliament (1958–1962)

23rd Parliament (1957–1958)

22nd Parliament (1953–1957)

21st Parliament (1949–1953)

20th Parliament (1945–1949)

19th Parliament (1940–1945)

18th Parliament (1936–1940)

17th Parliament (1930–1935)

16th Parliament (1926–1930)

15th Parliament (1926)

14th Parliament (1921–1925)

13th Parliament (1918–1921)

12th Parliament (1911–1917)

11th Parliament (1909–1911)

10th Parliament (1905–1908)

9th Parliament (1901–1904)

8th Parliament (1896–1900)

7th Parliament (1891–1896)

6th Parliament (1887–1891)

5th Parliament (1883–1887)

4th Parliament (1879–1882)

3rd Parliament (1874–1878)

2nd Parliament (1873–1874)

1st Parliament (1867–1872)

References

Sources 
 Parliament of Canada–Elected in By-Elections

Federal by-elections